Bela patagonica is a species of sea snail, a marine gastropod mollusk in the family Mangeliidae.

The variety Spirotropis patagonica magellanica (Martens, E.C. von, 1881) was originally described as Drillia patagonica Martens, E.C. von, 1881 with a length half as long.

Description
The shell size varies between 6 mm and 15 mm.

The shell is yellowish brown. The first whorls are globose, the third and following ones subangulated, with longitudinal short, fine ribs and close revolving striae.  The ribs are obsolete on the body whorl. The sinus is broad and shallow.

Distribution
This species occurs in the demersal zone of the Atlantic Ocean from Southern Brazil to Patagonia

Fossils have been found in Quaternary strata in Brazil.

References

 Sánchez, N. & Pastorino, G. (2022). New taxonomic position and neotype designation for the conoidean gastropod Pleurotoma patagonica d'Orbigny, 1841. Archiv für Molluskenkunde. 151(1): 67-74

External links
 
 
 Orbigny, A. D. d'. (1834-1847). Voyage dans l'Amérique méridionale (le Brésil, la république orientale de l'Uruguay, la République argentine, la Patagonie, la république du Chili, la république de Bolivia, la république du Pérou), exécuté pendant les années 1826, 1827, 1828, 1829, 1830, 1831, 1832 et 1833. Tome 5(3) Mollusques. pp. i-xliii, 1-758, 85 plates 

patagonica
Gastropods described in 1841